Ramsden v Peterborough (City of), [1993] 2 SCR 1084 is a leading Supreme Court of Canada decision where the Court struck down a bylaw prohibiting all postering on public property on the grounds that it violated freedom of expression under section 2(b) of the Canadian Charter of Rights and Freedoms.

Background
Kenneth Ramsden was charged on two separate occasions placing posters on hydro poles advertising his band. He claimed that the bylaw was unconstitutional. A justice of the peace found that the bylaw was constitutional and he was fined. The decision was upheld on appeal to the Provincial Court. However, on appeal to the Court of Appeal for Ontario the decision was overturned and it was held that the bylaw was in violation of the right to freedom of expression and could not be saved under section 1 of the Charter.

Opinion of the Court
Justice Iacobucci, writing for a unanimous Court, upheld the decision of the Ontario Court of Appeal.

Iacobucci examined the test for freedom of expression. He stated that section 2(b) is violated where a law, in either purpose or effect, limits expression. He found that the purpose of the bylaw was to do just that. Postering was a  form of expression as it conveyed some meaning.

Iacobucci found that even though the purpose of the bylaw was meritious, the absolute ban was not justifiable.

External links
 
 case summary from mapleleafweb.com

Canadian Charter of Rights and Freedoms case law
Canadian freedom of expression case law
Supreme Court of Canada cases
1993 in Canadian case law